Popstar (stylized PopStar) is a Brazilian daytime live reality television singing competition originally created, produced and aired by Rede Globo. The series premiered on Sunday,  July 9, 2017 at 1:00 p.m. / 12:00 p.m. (BRT / AMT).

The show features fourteen celebrity acts singing live in front of the nation and facing a panel of judges, known as Specialists, and the public vote in order to win the grand prize of R$250.000.
 
Fernanda Lima was the main host for the first season, while actor Tiago Abravanel served as backstage interviewer and social media correspondent from seasons one and two. Fernanda Lima was replaced by Taís Araújo in season two, while João Côrtes replaced Tiago Abravanel in season three.

Season chronology

Ratings and reception

Brazilian ratings
All numbers are in points and provided by Kantar Ibope Media.

References

External links
 PopStar on Gshow.com

2017 Brazilian television series debuts
Brazilian reality television series
Portuguese-language television shows
Rede Globo original programming